The defending champions: Rubén Ramírez Hidalgo and Santiago Ventura were eliminated by Rogério Dutra da Silva and Rui Machado already in the first round.
Italian pair Fabio Fognini and Paolo Lorenzi defeated 4th seeds Carlos Berlocq and Brian Dabul 6–3, 6–4 in the final match.

Seeds

Draw

Draw

External links
 Main Draw

Copa Petrobras Asuncion - Doubles
Copa Petrobras Asunción